Ragin is a 2004 Russian-Austrian drama film directed by Kirill Serebrennikov.

Plot 
The film takes place in Russia in the early twentieth century in a small provincial town. The plot focuses on doctors managing a county hospital. Suddenly he receives an interesting report in which the young psychiatrist Himmelsdorf demonstrates a method of treating psychosis and Ragin decides to use this method in his work.

Cast 
 Aleksei Guskov as Ragin
 Aleksandr Galibin as Gromov
 Dmitry Mulyar as Khobotov
 Natalya Nikulenko as Anna Ivanovna
 Zoya Buryak as Sanya
 Vladimir Krasnov as Sergei Sergeyevich
 Vitaliy Khaev as Nikita
 Sergei Parshin as Toptun
 Sergey Bekhterev as The Boy
 Yuriy Itskov as Moyseyka

References

External links 
 

2004 films
2000s Russian-language films
Films directed by Kirill Serebrennikov
Russian drama films
French drama films
2004 drama films
Austrian drama films
2000s French films